James William Whittaker (1828, Manchester - 6 September 1876, Betws-y-Coed) was a British watercolour painter, best known for his landscapes of North Wales.

Life 
He was born in a family of a warehouseman and began his artistic career as an apprentice to Manchester engraver Joseph Heyes, soon turning to painting. In 1858 he moved to Llanrwst, where he would paint local landscapes in watercolours. With the possible exception of a trip to Switzerland and Italy in about 1864 and a Northern journey in the late 1860s, he remained in North Wales for the rest of his life. Upon meeting Francis William Topham in Wales, Whittaker was encouraged to join the Society of Painters in Watercolours, becoming an associate in 1862, and a member in 1864. He died in 1876 by drowning in River Llugwy, where he fell trying to collect his painting gear. Whittaker was married to Sarah nee Heyes (daughter of Joseph Heyes), widowing her and leaving 4 children who outlived him.

Gallery

References 

1828 births
1876 deaths
19th-century English painters
English male painters
English engravers
English watercolourists
19th-century English male artists
Artists from Manchester